The 2012–13 CERS Cup was the 33rd season of the CERS Cup, Europe's second club roller hockey competition organized by CERH. Thirty teams from nine national associations qualified for the competition as a result of their respective national league placing in the previous season. Following a preliminary phase and two knockout rounds, Vendrell won the tournament at its final four, in Vendrell, Spain on 11 and 12 May 2013.

Preliminary phase 
The preliminary phase legs took place on 10 and 24 November 2012.

|}

Knockout stage
The knockout stage consisted in double-legged series for the round of 16 and the quarterfinals, where the four winners would join the Final Four in Vendrell, Spain.

See also
2012–13 CERH European League
2012–13 CERH Women's European League

References

External links
 CERH website
  Roller Hockey links worldwide
  Mundook-World Roller Hockey

World Skate Europe Cup
CERS Cup
CERS Cup